I Supermodel is a Chinese reality series and modeling competition. The show places a group of fourteen female contestants who are selected by a mentor to compete in teams of seven. The goal of the show is to immerse the finalists into the world of high fashion through several editorial shoots and high paced challenges, finding the perfect supermodel.

Filming for the show takes place in an overseas location that is unique to each season. The first season of the show was filmed in Melbourne, Australia, and began to air on March 21, 2015. On May 26, 2015 a second season was announced. Filming for the second season took place in London.

I Supermodel is currently one of the most highly regarded modeling series in China, with total views for season one reaching over 280 million on iQiyi, and ranking at #1 for shows of the same genre.

Format

Team selection
At the beginning of each season, the chosen contestants meet the two model mentors of the show. After evaluating their performance on the runway and in front of the lens, each judge alternates in picking a contestant for their team from the pool of selected finalists.

Challenges
Each episode contains a challenge focusing on elements important to modeling. The contestants are graded on a numerical basis, each earning a score for their performance. The team with the most points at the end of the challenge wins collectively, regardless of any individual losses or wins in the challenge. Challenges in the later half of the competition are won individually.

Judging and elimination
For judging, a panel of experts evaluates each contestants' performance on the photo shoot and determines who will be eliminated, with the mentors having little to no say in the final decision. Elimination follows the same format as a regular Top Model show, but the call-out takes place individually in each of the teams. This means that the last girl who has not received a photo in each team, must join the other one for elimination. In cases where both the worst and the second worst performers are in the same team, both are sent for elimination, while all of the members of the other team remain safe. The contestant who does not receive a photo is automatically eliminated.

Cycles

See also
China's Next Top Model

References

External links
Weibo site
Season 1 website
Season 2 website

 
2015 Chinese television series debuts
Chinese-language television shows
Modeling-themed reality television series
IQIYI original programming